Al-Insaf fima Yajib I'tiqaduh walā Yajūz al-Jahl bih, is an Islamic theological book, written by the Maliki-Ash'ari scholar Abu Bakr al-Baqillani (d. 403/1013), as a methodical refutation against the Mu'tazilis and the Anthropomorphists (al-Mushabbiha).

As an Ash'ari theologian, al-Baqillani disproved some theological doctrines formulated by these groups in dealing with a number of theological topics; the speech of God, the Qur'an and its characteristics, and other attributes of God. The Anthropomorphists believed that God is in the form of corporeal bodies together with their parts. He has hands, head, tongue, and other organs. Their notion is centralized to the doctrine that God has bodily materials. This doctrine was strongly rejected by al-Baqillani. His theological position takes the combination between rationalistic method and application of the revelation.

Al-Baqillani also elucidated his stance concerning mutashabihat verses (uncertain or doubtful passages whose meaning is open to two or more interpretations) which were literally understood by the Anthropomorphists. He analyzed verse (5) of Surat Taha, in which he commented that the God's istiwa' (God's "being established" on the Throne) is not similar with His creatures. He believed that the throne has neither space nor place because God continuously exists, as he noted:  He also said:

Content 
Al-Baqillani demonstrates that:
 Allah/God is supremely clear of all boundaries, He is not in a place nor in a direction. Motion and change in location do not apply to Him, nor does ignorance, lie or any other attribute of imperfection. He is seen by the believers in the afterlife.
 The Divine Attributes of Allah/God are in no way conceived as limbs (physical body parts like humans).

And other foundational Ash'ari beliefs.

See also 

 Asas al-Taqdis
 Al-Baz al-Ashhab
 Tabyin Kadhib al-Muftari
 The Moderation in Belief
 A Guide to Conclusive Proofs for the Principles of Belief
 List of Sunni books

Notes

References

External links 
 Book's page on Goodreads — Goodreads.com

Books by Al-Baqillani
Kalam
Sunni literature
Ash'ari literature
Islamic belief and doctrine
Books about anthropomorphism in Islamic theology